Ceuthophilus caudelli is a species of camel cricket in the family Rhaphidophoridae.  It is found in southwest North America.

References

Further reading

 
 

caudelli
Insects described in 1936